William Edward Gallagher (11 August 1885 – 11 October 1959) was an Australian rules footballer who played with Geelong in the Victorian Football League (VFL).

Notes

External links 

1885 births
1959 deaths
Australian rules footballers from Victoria (Australia)
Geelong Football Club players
North Geelong Football Club players